Einsteinium compounds are compounds that contain the element einsteinium (Es). These compounds largely have einsteinium forming in the +3 oxidation state, although they can also form in the +2 and +4 oxidation states. Because einsteinium is radioactive, these compounds haven't been studied in great detail.

Properties of Einsteinium compounds

Oxides 
Einsteinium(III) oxide (Es2O3) was obtained by burning einsteinium(III) nitrate. It forms colorless cubic crystals, which were first characterized from microgram samples sized about 30 nanometers. Two other phases, monoclinic and hexagonal, are known for this oxide. The formation of a certain Es2O3 phase depends on the preparation technique and sample history, and there is no clear phase diagram. Interconversions between the three phases can occur spontaneously, as a result of self-irradiation or self-heating. The hexagonal phase is isotypic with lanthanum oxide where the Es3+ ion is surrounded by a 6-coordinated group of O2− ions.

Halides 

Einsteinium halides are known for the oxidation states +2 and +3. The most stable state is +3 for all halides from fluoride to iodide.

Einsteinium(III) fluoride (EsF3) can be precipitated from einsteinium(III) chloride solutions upon reaction with fluoride ions. An alternative preparation procedure is to exposure einsteinium(III) oxide to chlorine trifluoride (ClF3) or F2 gas at a pressure of 1–2 atmospheres and a temperature between 300 and 400 °C. The EsF3 crystal structure is hexagonal, as in californium(III) fluoride (CfF3) where the Es3+ ions are 8-fold coordinated by fluorine ions in a bicapped trigonal prism arrangement.

Einsteinium(III) chloride (EsCl3) can be prepared by annealing einsteinium(III) oxide in the atmosphere of dry hydrogen chloride vapors at about 500 °C for some 20 minutes. It crystallizes upon cooling at about 425 °C into an orange solid with a hexagonal structure of UCl3 type, where einsteinium atoms are 9-fold coordinated by chlorine atoms in a tricapped trigonal prism geometry. Einsteinium(III) bromide (EsBr3) is a pale-yellow solid with a monoclinic structure of AlCl3 type, where the einsteinium atoms are octahedrally coordinated by bromine (coordination number 6).

The divalent compounds of einsteinium are obtained by reducing the trivalent halides with hydrogen:
2 EsX3 + H2 → 2 EsX2 + 2 HX,    X = F, Cl, Br, I

Einsteinium(II) chloride (EsCl2), einsteinium(II) bromide (EsBr2), and einsteinium(II) iodide (EsI2) have been produced and characterized by optical absorption, with no structural information available yet.

Known oxyhalides of einsteinium include EsOCl, EsOBr and EsOI. These salts are synthesized by treating a trihalide with a vapor mixture of water and the corresponding hydrogen halide: for example, EsCl3 + H2O/HCl to obtain EsOCl.

Organoeinsteinium compounds 
The high radioactivity of einsteinium has a potential use in radiation therapy, and organometallic complexes have been synthesized in order to deliver einsteinium atoms to an appropriate organ in the body. Experiments have been performed on injecting einsteinium citrate (as well as fermium compounds) to dogs. Einsteinium(III) was also incorporated into beta-diketone chelate complexes, since analogous complexes with lanthanides previously showed strongest UV-excited luminescence among metallorganic compounds. When preparing einsteinium complexes, the Es3+ ions were 1000 times diluted with Gd3+ ions. This allowed reducing the radiation damage so that the compounds did not disintegrate during the period of 20 minutes required for the measurements. The resulting luminescence from Es3+ was much too weak to be detected. This was explained by the unfavorable relative energies of the individual constituents of the compound that hindered efficient energy transfer from the chelate matrix to Es3+ ions. Similar conclusion was drawn for other actinides americium, berkelium and fermium.

Luminescence of Es3+ ions was however observed in inorganic hydrochloric acid solutions as well as in organic solution with di(2-ethylhexyl)orthophosphoric acid. It shows a broad peak at about 1064 nanometres (half-width about 100 nm) which can be resonantly excited by green light (ca. 495 nm wavelength). The luminescence has a lifetime of several microseconds and the quantum yield below 0.1%. The relatively high, compared to lanthanides, non-radiative decay rates in Es3+ were associated with the stronger interaction of f-electrons with the inner Es3+ electrons.

See also 

 Californium compounds
 Berkelium compounds

References 

Einsteinium compounds
Einsteinium
Chemical compounds by element